Great Britain, represented by the British Olympic Association (BOA), competed at the 1936 Summer Olympics in Berlin, Germany. 208 competitors, 171 men and 37 women, took part in 91 events in 17 sports. British athletes have competed in every Summer Olympic Games.

Medallists

Gold
Miles Bellville, Christopher Boardman, Russell Harmer, Charles Leaf, Leonard Martin — Yachting
Jack Beresford, Dick Southwood — Double Scull Rowing
Godfrey Brown, Godfrey Rampling, Freddie Wolff, Bill Roberts — 4 × 400 m Relay Athletics
Harold Whitlock — 50 km Walk Athletics

Silver
Alan Barrett, Martin Bristow, Peter Jackson, John Sturrock — Rowing Fours
Godfrey Brown — 400m Athletics
Audrey Brown, Barbara Burke, Eileen Hiscock, Violet Olney — 4 × 100 m Relay
David Dawnay, Bryan Fowler, Humphrey Guinness, William Hinde — Polo
Donald Finlay — 110m Hurdles
Ernest Harper — Marathon
Dorothy Tyler-Odam — High Jump

Bronze
Richard Fanshawe, Edward Howard-Vyse, Alec Scott — Equestrian Team eventing
Harry Hill, Ernest Johnson, Charles King, Ernest Mills — Track Cycling Team Pursuit
Peter Scott — O-Jolle Yachting

Athletics

Boxing

Canoeing

Cycling

Eleven cyclists, all men, represented Great Britain in 1936.

Individual road race
 Charles Holland
 Jackie Bone
 Bill Messer
 Alick Bevan

Team road race
 Charles Holland
 Jackie Bone
 Bill Messer
 Alick Bevan

Sprint
 Ray Hicks

Time trial
 Ray Hicks

Tandem
 Ernest Chambers
 John Sibbit

Team pursuit
 Harry Hill
 Ernest Johnson
 Charles King
 Ernie Mills

Diving

Equestrian

Fencing

18 fencers, 16 men and 2 women, represented Great Britain in 1936.

Men's foil
 Emrys Lloyd
 Denis Pearce
 David Bartlett

Men's team foil
 Denis Pearce, David Bartlett, Emrys Lloyd, Geoffrey Hett, Christopher Hammersley, Roger Tredgold

Men's épée
 Ian Campbell-Gray
 Charles de Beaumont
 Douglas Dexter

Men's team épée
 Charles de Beaumont, Douglas Dexter, Albert Pelling, Ian Campbell-Gray, Terry Beddard, Bertie Childs

Men's sabre
 Oliver Trinder
 Guy Harry
 Robin Brook

Men's team sabre
 Oliver Trinder, Arthur Pilbrow, Guy Harry, Robin Brook, Roger Tredgold

Women's foil
 Judy Guinness Penn-Hughes
 Betty Carnegy-Arbuthnott

Football

Gymnastics

Modern pentathlon

Three male pentathletes represented Great Britain in 1936.

 Jeffrey MacDougall
 Percy Legard
 Archibald Jack

Polo

Rowing

Great Britain had 18 rowers participate in five out of seven rowing events in 1936.

 Men's single sculls - Unplaced
 Humphrey Warren

 Men's double sculls - Gold
 Jack Beresford
 Dick Southwood

 Men's coxless pair - Unplaced
 David Burnford
 Thomas Cree

 Men's coxless four - Silver
 Alan Barrett
 Martin Bristow
 Peter Jackson
 John Sturrock

 Men's eight - Fourth
 Tom Askwith
 Ran Laurie
 John Cherry
 Hugh Mason
 McAllister Lonnon
 Annesley Kingsford
 Desmond Kingsford
 John Couchman
 Noel Duckworth (cox)

Sailing

Swimming

Water polo

Weightlifting

Wrestling

References

External links
 http://www.olympics.org.uk/gamesmedallists.aspx?gt=s&ga=11

Nations at the 1936 Summer Olympics
1936
Summer Olympics